Lee Winston Leandro da Silva Oliveira, or simply Lee (born 9 March 1988 in São Paulo) is a goalkeeper who plays for Clube Atlético Tubarão.

Career
Lee Oliveira started his career with loan spells to Colo Colo-BA and Tigres do Brasil before he was handed his professional debut with Vitória. His league debut was on 24 June 2010 in a 0-0 draw against Grêmio Barueri. He has achieved notoriety in his next match against Santos when he saved an Antonin Panenka-style penalty kick from Neymar after standing still in the goal.

After being released from Vitória, Lee Oliveira signed for Atlético Mineiro as a third goalkeeper for the team behind Renan Ribeiro and Giovanni. His league debut for Galo was on 27 November 2011 against Botafogo, playing the entire second half of the match.

In July 2014, Lee Oliveira moved abroad, signing a three-year contract with Académica de Coimbra in Portugal. He made his debut in a 2014–15 Taça de Portugal game against Santa Maria F.C.

On 8 June 2016, after suffering top flight relegation with Académica, Lee signed a one-year deal with Sepahan F.C.

Career statistics
(Correct )

Honours
Vitória
Campeonato Baiano: 2010
Campeonato do Nordeste: 2010

Atlético Mineiro
Campeonato Mineiro: 2012, 2013
Copa Libertadores: 2013

References

External links

1988 births
Living people
Footballers from São Paulo
Brazilian footballers
Brazilian expatriate footballers
Esporte Clube Vitória players
Esporte Clube Tigres do Brasil players
Clube Atlético Mineiro players
Boa Esporte Clube players
Associação Académica de Coimbra – O.A.F. players
Sepahan S.C. footballers
Sociedade Esportiva e Recreativa Caxias do Sul players
Clube Atlético Tubarão players
Campeonato Brasileiro Série A players
Campeonato Brasileiro Série B players
Campeonato Brasileiro Série D players
Primeira Liga players
Persian Gulf Pro League players
Association football goalkeepers
Brazilian expatriate sportspeople in Portugal
Brazilian expatriate sportspeople in Iran
Expatriate footballers in Portugal
Expatriate footballers in Iran